Al Ahmadi may refer to:
 Ahmadi, followers of the Ahmadiyya sect in Islam
 Al Ahmadi District
 Al Ahmadi Governorate
 Al Ahmadi, Kuwait, suburb of Kuwait City, located in Al Ahmadi Governorate